The 2017 Women's International Festival of Hockey is the second edition of the annual International Festival of Hockey. The tournament will be held in Victoria, Australia. The tournament will take place between 5–12 November in the Victorian cities, Melbourne and Bendigo. Four teams will compete in the tournament, an increase from two at the previous edition.

All times are local (UTC+10:00).

Participating nations

Results

Bendigo
The first stage of the tournament was a test match in Bendigo at the Bendigo Hockey Complex.

Test match

Melbourne
The second stage of the tournament is a 4 team competition at the State Netball and Hockey Centre in Melbourne.

Pool stage

Classification matches

Third and fourth place

Final

Statistics

Final standings

Goalscorers
5 Goals
 Kelly Jonker
4 Goals
 Lidewij Welten
3 Goals
 Brooke Peris
2 Goals

 Savannah Fitzpatrick
 Yuri Nagai
 Kana Nomura
 Maartje Krekelaar
 Ireen van den Assem

1 Goal

 Jane Claxton
 Emily Hurtz
 Stephanie Kershaw
 Madi Ratcliffe
 Emily Smith
 Carlien Dirkse van den Heuvel
 Marloes Keetels
 Laurien Leurink
 Frédérique Matla
 Caia van Maasakker
 Malou Pheninckx
 Casey Di Nardo
 Melissa Gonzalez
 Caitlin van Sickle

References

women's
International Festival of Hockey
2017 in Australian women's field hockey
2017 in American women's sports
2017 in Dutch women's sport
2017 in Japanese women's sport
International women's field hockey competitions hosted by Australia
November 2017 sports events in Australia